The 2000–01 San Jose Sharks season was the team's tenth season of operation in the National Hockey League (NHL). The campaign saw the Sharks win 40 games for the first time in franchise history. In so doing, the team set a new franchise record for points (95) and clinched a playoff berth for the fourth consecutive season.

During the off-season, general manager Dean Lombardi sought to add depth to the Sharks' offense. In addition to retaining nearly all of the prior season's players, Lombardi traded for forward Niklas Sundstrom and signed gritty right winger Scott Thornton. These moves paid dividends immediately, as the Sharks' offense continued to function well despite injuries to key forwards Owen Nolan and Vincent Damphousse. The Sharks also benefited from the strong play of Patrick Marleau, who set career highs in goals (25), assists (27), and points (52) in his fourth season with the team. The Sharks' defense also improved behind the quality play of Gary Suter, Brad Stuart and Scott Hannan.

The 2000–01 regular season is also remembered for the emergence of second-year goaltender Evgeni Nabokov. While Nabokov had been impressive in limited action one season earlier, he remained the backup to starter Steve Shields. However, an early-season ankle injury to Shields forced Nabokov into a starting role. With Nabokov as their starter, the Sharks raced out to a 9–2–2 start. By the time Shields returned from his injury, Nabokov was fully entrenched as starting goaltender. Nabokov was awarded the Calder Memorial Trophy at the end of the season for his play.

Late in the 2000–01 season, the team traded Shields and struggling star Jeff Friesen to Anaheim for superstar forward Teemu Selanne. In making the trade, the Sharks sought to establish themselves as legitimate Stanley Cup contenders for the first time in franchise history. While Selanne played well in limited action, the Sharks' aspirations proved premature. In the first round of the 2001 Stanley Cup playoffs, the team was defeated by the St. Louis Blues in six games.

Off-season

Regular season

Final standings

Schedule and results

Playoffs

Western Conference Quarterfinals: vs. (2) St. Louis Blues
St. Louis Blues wins series 4–2

Player statistics

Awards and records

Transactions

Draft picks

See also
2000–01 NHL season

References
 

San
San
San Jose Sharks seasons
San Jose Sharks
San Jose Sharks